Burkina Faso is a religiously diverse society, with Islam being the dominant religion. According to the latest 2019 census, 63.8% of the population adheres to Islam. Around 26.3% of the population practices Christianity, 9.0% follow Animism/Folk Religion (African traditional religion), and that 0.9% are unaffiliated or follow other faiths.

The vast majority of Muslims in Burkina Faso are Sunni Muslims who follow Maliki school of law, deeply influenced by Sufism. The Shi'a and Ahmadiyya branches of Islam also have a presence in the country. A significant number of Sunni Muslims identify with the Tijaniyah Sufi order.

Statistics
Statistics on religion in Burkina Faso are inexact, because Islam and Christianity are often practiced in tandem with African traditional religions. The Government of Burkina Faso stated in its most recent census (2019) that 63.8% of the population practice Islam, and that the majority of this group belong to the Sunni branch, while a small minority adheres to the Shi'a branch. A significant number of Sunni Muslims identify with the Tijaniyah Sufi order. The Government has also estimated that some 26.3% are Christians (20.1% being Roman Catholics and 6.2% members of various Protestant denominations), 9.0% follow Traditional indigenous beliefs such as the Dogon religion, 0.2% have other religions, and 0.7% have none (atheism is virtually nonexistent).

Statistics on religious affiliation are approximate because Syncretism, incorporating traditional indigenous beliefs and practices, is widespread among both Christians and Muslims. The majority of citizens practice traditional indigenous religious beliefs to varying degrees, and strict adherence to Christian and Muslim beliefs is often nominal. Almost all citizens are believers, and atheism is virtually nonexistent. One 2015 study estimates some 200,000 Christian believers from a Muslim background in the country, though not all are citizens.

Geography
Muslims reside largely around the northern, eastern, and western borders, while Christians live in the center of the country. People practice traditional indigenous religious beliefs throughout the country, especially in rural communities. The region with the largest Animist population is Sud-Ouest at 48.1%. Ouagadougou, the capital, has a mixed Muslim and Christian population; however, Bobo-Dioulasso, the country's second-largest city, is mostly Muslim. Small Syrian and Lebanese immigrant communities reside in the two largest cities, and are overwhelmingly (more than 90 percent) Christian.

Ethnicity
There are more than 60 different ethnicities in the country. Most ethnic groups are religiously heterogeneous, although the Fula and Dioula communities are majority-Muslim.

See also
 Islam in Burkina Faso
 Roman Catholicism in Burkina Faso
 Freedom of religion in Burkina Faso

References